Balmacara is a scattered village on the north shore of Loch Alsh near Kyle of Lochalsh, Ross-shire, Highland and is in the Scottish council area of the Highland, Scotland. In 1946, Lady Hamilton, bequeathed the  Balmacara crofting estate to the people of Scotland, by donating it to the National Trust for Scotland. In 1954 the nearby Lochalsh House was conveyed to the Trust.

The Shinty club, Kinlochshiel play in the adjacent hamlet of Kirkton.

References

Populated places in Lochalsh